The Ontario Liberal Party leadership election, 1992, held on February 8–9, 1992 elected Lyn McLeod as the leader of the Ontario Liberal Party. McLeod replaced David Peterson who resigned after losing his seat in the 1990 provincial election. McLeod won after five ballots against a field of five other candidates. She was the first woman to head a major political party in Ontario.

Background
The leadership convention was held to replace David Peterson who resigned after losing his seat in the 1990 provincial election. Initially, Robert Nixon was appointed as interim leader but he resigned on July 31, 1991 to take a federal patronage position to conduct a review of Atomic Energy of Canada Limited. Murray Elston was then appointed as interim leader but he resigned when he announced his candidacy on November 18. Jim Bradley was appointed as the third interim leader, in which post he remained until the leadership convention. The leadership race officially began on November 7, 1991, 90 days before a convention which was held on the weekend of February 7–9, 1992 in Hamilton, Ontario.

Candidates
Six caucus members entered the race. They were Charles Beer, Murray Elston, Steve Mahoney, Lyn McLeod, David Ramsay, and Greg Sorbara. Mahoney was first off the mark when he officially announced his candidacy on November 7, 1991.

Procedure
The party adopted a procedure to elect a leader that included elements of both direct elections and a leadership convention. Members who had been party members for at least 90 days would choose delegates for the convention. Delegates sent by each riding varied depending on their support for individual candidates. Each delegate was committed to vote for a particular candidate on the first ballot but were free to choose on subsequent ballots. The hybrid format was an effort to include local democracy but with the media attention that follows a traditional convention. A spending cap of $250,000 was placed for each candidates expenses and $671,000 was budgeted for the convention weekend.

Convention
Elston led until 5th ballot when he was defeated by McLeod by a slim margin of 9 votes out of a total 2,315 votes cast. Mcleod's election was the first time a woman was chosen to lead one of the three main Ontario parties. McLeod's victory was attributed to two factors. She made a deal with second-tier leadership contender Charles Beer. The Elston camp had an unexpectedly large lead over McLeod on the first ballot, as McLeod lent Beer some of her delegates to give him a respectable showing, and Elston's margin dropped significantly when the eliminated Beer threw his full support behind McLeod.

In her acceptance speech she promised to balance the budget and defeat the New Democrats in next election. After the convention, she revealed that she had spent $272,947 on campaign, breaking the spending cap. Elston also admitted overspending with expenses totalling $305,815.

Ballot results
 = Eliminated from next round
 = Winner

There were 21 spoiled ballots on the final count, mostly from die-hard supporters of Sorbara.

References

1992 elections in Canada
1992
1992
Ontario Liberal Party leadership election